Laughter in Paradise is a 1951 British comedy film, starring Alastair Sim, Fay Compton, George Cole, and Guy Middleton. The film was remade as Some Will, Some Won't (1970).

Plot
In his will, notorious practical joker Henry Russell leaves £50,000 to each of his four surviving relatives, provided they first perform prescribed tasks that are completely contrary to their natures.

Law-abiding retired army officer Deniston Russell, who writes lurid crime novels under several pen names, has a week to get himself arrested and jailed for exactly 28 days. Difficult, snobbish Agnes Russell has to find employment as a domestic servant in a middle-class home, again within a week, and keep her position for a month. Simon Russell, a penniless womanising con man, has to marry the first single woman he speaks to. Timid Herbert Russell has to hold up the bank manager he works for in his office, using a mask and a toy pistol, and obtain the bank keys for two minutes.

Deniston is thwarted repeatedly in his attempts, but finally manages to complete his task by smashing a shop window and assaulting a policeman. It costs him his fiancée Elizabeth when he is brought up before the magistrate, Elizabeth's father, but his secretary Sheila reveals her love for him and promises to stand by him.

Agnes finds work with the irascible, demanding Gordon Webb. When Gordon sacks her, she begs to stay for a month, finally offering to pay him £1000. He does change his mind, if only for the enjoyment of tormenting her further. He also hires a private detective, Roger Godfrey, to find out what she is up to. Roger falls in love with Gordon's long-suffering daughter Joan, who is unwilling to marry him as her father depends on her. After Agnes persuades the girl to seize the chance of happiness, Gordon first sacks her and then calls round to take her out to dinner.

Though the first single woman Simon speaks to is Frieda, a cigarette girl in a club he frequents, being in search of richer prey he breaks his promise. An attractive but suspiciously available young woman called Lucille scoops him up and, once they are married, reveals that she is the penniless niece of his butler, in whom he unwisely confided.

When Herbert finally gathers the nerve to go through with his assignment, he inadvertently foils an actual robbery and becomes a hero, plastered across the front pages of the press. He is rewarded with a branch managership. Susan, a fellow bank employee, is proud and happy to be his girl.

Then the executor gathers the four heirs together and informs them that there is in fact no money left. The whole exercise was Henry's last practical joke. Agnes, Deniston and Herbert burst into laughter. Simon is annoyed at first, until he looks out of the window at his conniving and equally unscrupulous wife, who is waiting for him with a bottle of champagne. Then he too joins in the merriment.

Cast

Alastair Sim as Deniston Russell
Fay Compton as Agnes Russell
Guy Middleton as Simon Russell
George Cole as Herbert Russell
Hugh Griffith as Henry Russell
Ernest Thesiger as Endicott, Henry's executor
Beatrice Campbell as Lucille Grayson
Mackenzie Ward as Benson, Simon's butler
Joyce Grenfell as Elizabeth Robson
A. E. Matthews as Sir Charles Robson
John Laurie as Gordon Webb
Veronica Hurst as Joan Webb
Anthony Steel as Roger Godfrey
Eleanor Summerfield as Sheila Wilcott
Charlotte Mitchell as Ethel, Agnes's maid
Leslie Dwyer as Police station sergeant 
Colin Gordon as Police station constable 
Ronald Adam as Wagstaffe, the bank manager 
Michael Pertwee as Stewart, a bank employee 
Mary Germaine as Susan Heath 
Audrey Hepburn as Frieda, a cigarette girl
Noel Howlett as Clerk of the Court 
Martin Boddey as Store detective
Arthur Howard as passenger in train with Herbert (uncredited)

Eleanor Summerfield and Noel Howlett both appeared, although in different roles, in the 1970 remake Some Will, Some Won't.

Production
This was Hepburn's first professional appearance on film (save for a brief role in a 1948 Dutch film entitled Dutch in Seven Lessons and a bit part in 1951's One Wild Oat), with her two scenes as a cigarette girl totalling 43 seconds. They were recreated by Jennifer Love Hewitt in the 2000 biopic The Audrey Hepburn Story. Anthony Steel also has a small role.
The film editor Giulio Zampi would go on to produce the 1970 remake Some Will, Some Won't.

Reception
Laughter in Paradise was the fourth most popular film at the British box-office in 1951. The New York Times in November 1951 called the film a "merely pleasant, not especially surprising, comedy".

In modern reviews, the Radio Times, David Parkinson gave the film four out of five stars, and praised the "fantastic performance of Alastair Sim as the henpecked thriller writer", adding, "the scene in which he tries to shoplift is one of the funniest in a career overladen with choice comic moments," while Britmovie called the film "a sure-fire British comedy that's sprightly execution doesn’t leave many dull moments."

References

External links 

Modern Review (Undated) at screenonline
Contemporaneous Review (June, 1951) at screenonline

1951 films
1951 comedy films
British comedy films
British black-and-white films
Films shot at Associated British Studios
Films directed by Mario Zampi
Films set in England
Films set in London
1950s English-language films
1950s British films